Dubuque is the county seat of Dubuque County, Iowa, United States, located along the Mississippi River. At the time of the 2020 census, the population of Dubuque was 59,667. The city lies at the junction of Iowa, Illinois, and Wisconsin, a region locally known as the Tri-State Area. It serves as the main commercial, industrial, educational, and cultural center for the area. Geographically, it is part of the Driftless Area, a portion of North America that escaped all three phases of the Wisconsin Glaciation.

Dubuque is a regional tourist destination featuring the city's unique architecture, casinos and river location. It is home to five institutions of higher education. Dubuque has historically been a center of manufacturing, the local economy also includes health care, publishing, and financial service sectors.

History

Spain gained control of the Louisiana Territory west of the Mississippi River following the 1763 defeat of the French; the British took over all territory to the east. The first permanent European settler in what is now Dubuque was Quebecois pioneer Julien Dubuque, who arrived in 1785. In 1788, he received permission from the Spanish government and the local Meskwaki American Indians to mine the area's rich lead deposits. Control of Louisiana and Dubuque's mines shifted briefly back to France in 1800, then to the United States in 1803, following the Louisiana Purchase. The Meskwaki continued to mine with the full support of the U.S. government until 1830 when the Meskwaki were illegally pushed out of the mine region by American prospectors.

The current City of Dubuque was named after Julien Dubuque, settled at the southern end of a large flat plain adjacent to the Mississippi River. The city was officially chartered in 1833, located in unorganized territory of the United States. The region was designated as the Iowa Territory in 1838 and was included in the newly created State of Iowa in 1846. After the lead resources were exhausted, the city became home to numerous industries. Dubuque became a center for the timber industry because of its proximity to forests in Minnesota and Wisconsin, and was later dominated by various millworking businesses. Also important were boat building, brewing, and later, the railroad industry. In 1874, the Diamond Jo Line moved its company headquarters to Dubuque. Diamond Jo Line established a shipyard at Eagle Point in 1878. Just two years later, the company was the largest employer in Dubuque, putting 78 people to work, 75 of whom worked at the shipyard earning their collective $800$1,000 per week in wages.

Between 1860 and 1880, Dubuque was one of the 100 largest urban areas in the United States. Iowa's first church was built by methodists in 1833. Since then, Iowans have followed a variety of religious traditions.

Beginning in the mid-19th century and into the early 20th century, thousands of poor German and Irish Catholic immigrants came to the city to work in the manufacturing centers. The city's large Roman Catholic congregations led to its designation as the seat of the newly established Archdiocese of Dubuque. Numerous convents, abbeys, and other religious institutions were built. The ethnic German and Irish descendants maintain a strong Catholic presence in the city. Nicholas E. Gonner (1835-1892), a Catholic immigrant from Pfaffenthal in Luxembourg, founded the Catholic Publishing Company of Dubuque, Iowa. His son Nicholas E. Gonner Jr. (1870-1922) took over in 1892, editing two German-language weeklies, an English-language weekly, and the Daily Tribune, the only Catholic daily newspaper ever published in the United States.

Early in the 20th century, Dubuque was one of several sites of a brass era automobile company, Adams-Farwell; like most others, it folded. Subsequently, Dubuque grew significantly, and industrial activity remained its economic mainstay until the 1980s. Tommy John, who pitched for the Dubuque Packers in 1961, recalled that the town was "about 98 percent Catholic" back then. "Dubuque was the epitome of small-town life," John wrote. "The people were friendly, everyone knew everybody else, and there wasn't a thing to do: no excitement, few restaurants or recreation choices, a decaying slum section. So we spent as much time as we could at the ball park...At certain times of the year, the fish flies fester in hordes like a biblical plague." A series of changes in manufacturing and the onset of the "Farm Crisis" in the 1980s led to a large decline in the sector and the city's economy as a whole. In the 1990s, the economy diversified rapidly, shifting away from heavy industry. Tourism, high technology, and publishing are now among the largest and fastest-growing businesses. Dubuque attracts well over 1,500,000 tourists annually, and the number continues to increase. The city has encouraged the development of the America's River Project's tourist attractions in the Port of Dubuque, the expansion of the city's colleges, and the continued growth of shopping centers, such as Asbury Plaza.

Geography

Dubuque is located at  (42.50, -90.69).

Downtown 
Downtown Dubuque contains the city's central business district and many of its government and cultural institutions. It is the center of Dubuque's transportation and commercial sectors and the hub of the various outlying districts and neighborhoods. It is in east-central Dubuque, along the Mississippi River, and includes the area north of Maus Park, south of 17th Street, east of the bluff line, and west of the river.

The area is made up of several distinct neighborhoods, each of which has a unique history and character. These include Cable Car Square/Cathedral Square, the Central Business District, Jackson Park/Upper Main, Lower Main, and the Warehouse District. The Warehouse District in particular has experienced massive renovations and an influx in new businesses after a plethora of investments since 2005. Another area of note downtown is the Port of Dubuque, which has had massive new investment and construction since the December 2002 opening of the Grand Harbor Resort and Waterpark. The downtown area includes a number of significant buildings, many of them historic, such as the Shot Tower, St. Raphael's Cathedral, and the Dubuque County Courthouse, reflecting the city's early and continuing importance to the region.

North End 

Dubuque's North End area was first settled in the late 19th century by working-class German immigrants. The German-American community sought to establish German Catholic churches separate from the Irish Catholic churches downtown and in the South End. The area retains its working-class roots and is home to some of Dubuque's largest factories.

The North End is roughly defined, but generally includes the territory north of 17th Street and east of North Grandview Avenue and Kaufmann Avenue. The area is made up of two main hills (west of Central Avenue, and west of Lincoln Avenue), and two main valleys, the Couler Valley (between the two hills), and the "Point" neighborhood, adjacent to the Mississippi River. It is home to Dubuque's two main cemeteries, Linwood Cemetery (established for Protestants), and Mt. Calvary Cemetery (established for Catholics).

Other important sites in the North End include:
Bee Branch Creek
Eagle Point Park
Holy Ghost Catholic Church
Linwood Cemetery
Lock and Dam No. 11
Mathias Ham House
Mt. Calvary Cemetery
Sacred Heart Catholic Church

South End 
The South End was traditionally the Irish American neighborhood, and became known as Little Dublin. It centered around southern portions of Downtown Dubuque. Remnants of Irish culture still survive, with Irish pubs such as Murph's South End Tap and The Lift, and stores such as Shamrock Imports still operating. Irish culture in Dubuque also revolves around the city's Irish Catholic churches, St. Columbkille's, St. Patrick's, and St. Raphael's Cathedral.

The South End is now much larger, including all the land south of Dodge Street, east of Fremont Avenue, and north of the Key West area. It has many of the city's "old money" neighborhoods, especially along South Grandview and Fremont Avenues and around the Dubuque Golf & Country Club. Many South End neighborhoods have a more spacious and park-like appearance, contrasting with the more urban North End.

Other important sites in the South End include:

Archdiocese of Dubuque headquarters
St. Pius X Seminary
Louis Murphy Park
Mines of Spain State Rec. Area

Mt. Carmel Convent
St. Raphael's Cathedral
Valentine Park
Wartburg Theological Seminary

West End 
Dubuque's West End is a large, mostly suburban area settled almost entirely after the Second World War. Development was spurred by the onset of the massive baby-boom generation and sharply higher demand for new housing. Expansion began with the construction of the John Deere Homes in the Hillcrest Park neighborhood, which were financed by Deere & Company for its workers. Soon after, many large shopping centers were built, including Plaza 20, and the then-largest enclosed shopping mall in Iowa, Kennedy Mall.

The area continues to expand rapidly, with new subdivisions and shopping centers stretching out for miles from downtown. The West End is not clearly defined, but is generally considered to include all the suburban-style growth west of North Grandview Avenue, the University of Dubuque, and the Valentine Park neighborhood. The area is home to a wide variety of mostly middle-class neighborhoods and city parks, but also includes many of the city's largest schools, industrial parks, and all its large shopping centers. The area's expansion has also led to rapid growth in suburban Asbury and exurban Peosta, Iowa, both of which adjoin the West Side. The west side has also been acknowledged by a viral YouTube video named Rappin' for Jesus, where a church named the "West Dubuque Second Church of Christ" was mentioned. Both the video and church were made up, and the video was labeled as a hoax.

Other important sites in the West End include:

Asbury Plaza
Asbury Square Shopping Center
Bunker Hill Golf Course
Dubuque Arboretum & Botanical Gardens
Emmaus Bible College
Flora Park

Hempstead High School
Kennedy Mall
Medical Associates Clinic - West Campus
Mt. Loretto Convent
Plaza 20
Resurrection Catholic Church

Townsquare Media Dubuque radio stations
Tri-State Christian School
Veterans Memorial Park
Wacker Plaza
Wahlert High School
Warren Plaza

Climate
Dubuque has a humid continental climate (Köppen Dfa), which gives it four distinct seasons. The weather is not as extreme as that in other parts of the Midwest, such as Minnesota or Wisconsin. Spring is usually wet and rainy, summers are sunny and warm, autumn is mild, and winters are typically cloudy and snowy.

Notes

Demographics

Dubuque metropolitan area
Dubuque is the primary city in the Dubuque Metropolitan Statistical Area (MSA). It is at the junction of four major highways and two major railroads. Its location along the river has formed the city into a regional hub. The Dubuque area is the general area encompassing Dubuque, Iowa. The MSA proper includes the entirety of Dubuque County. The official population of the Dubuque County was 93,653 as of the 2010 population estimates.

2020 census
As of the census of 2020, the population was 59,667. The racial makeup of the city was 85.1% White, 6.3% Black or African American, 1.3% Pacific Islander, 1.2% Asian, 0.4% Native American, 1.3% from other races, and 4.4% from two or more races. Ethnically, the population was 3.7% Hispanic or Latino of any race and 83.8% Non-Hispanic White.

2010 census
As of the census of 2010, there were 57,637 people, 23,506 households, and 13,888 families residing in the city. The racial makeup of the city was 91.7% White, 4.0% African American, 0.3% Native American, 1.1% Asian, 0.5% Pacific Islander, 0.6% from other races, and 1.8% from two or more races. Hispanic or Latino people of any race were 2.4% of the population.

There were 23,505 households, of which 27.4% had children under the age of 18 living with them, 43.6% were married couples living together, 11.1% had a female householder with no husband present, 4.3% had a male householder with no wife present, and 40.9% were non-families. 33.7% of all households were made up of individuals, and 12.7% had someone living alone who was 65 years of age or older. The average household size was 2.28 and the average family size was 2.92.

The median age in the city was 38 years. 21.4% of residents were under the age of 18; 13% were between the ages of 18 and 24; 23.3% were from 25 to 44; 25.9% were from 45 to 64; and 16.5% were 65 years of age or older. The gender makeup of the city was 48.4% male and 51.6% female.

2000 census
As of the census of 2000, there were 57,686 people, 22,560 households, and 14,303 families residing in the city. The racial makeup of the city was 96.15% White, 1.21% Black or African American, 0.19% Native American, 0.68% Asian, 0.11% Pacific Islander, 0.69% from other races, and 0.96% from two or more races. 1.58% of the population were Hispanic or Latino of any race.

There were 22,560 households, out of which 30.0% had children under the age of 18 living with them, 50.3% were married couples living together, 10.0% had a female householder with no husband present, and 36.6% were non-families. 31.0% of all households were made up of individuals, and 12.6% had someone living alone who was 65 years of age or older. The average household size was 2.37 and the average family size was 2.99.

Age spread: 23.6% under the age of 18, 11.8% from 18 to 24, 26.5% from 25 to 44, 21.6% from 45 to 64, and 16.5% who were 65 years of age or older. The median age was 37 years. For every 100 females, there were 90.0 males. For every 100 females age 18 and over, there were 86.2 males.

The median income for a household in the city was $36,785, and the median income for a family was $46,564. Males had a median income of $31,543 versus $22,565 for females. The per capita income for the city was $19,616. About 5.5% of families and 9.5% of the population were below the poverty line, including 9.3% of those under age 18 and 12.5% of those age 65 or over.

Religion

Since its founding, Dubuque has had, and continues to have, a strong religious tradition. Local Catholic settlers established what would become the first Christian church in Iowa, St. Raphael's Cathedral, in 1833. The city also played a key role in the expansion of the Catholic Church into the Western United States, as it was the administrative center for Catholics in what is now Iowa, Minnesota, North Dakota, and South Dakota. Many important Catholic religious leaders have lived in Dubuque, including its first bishop, Mathias Loras; Fr Samuel Mazzuchelli, OP; Clement Smyth; and Mother Mary Frances Clarke, BVM. Catholic parishes around the city include Saint Raphael's, Saint Mary's,
Sacred Heart, Holy Ghost, Saint Patrick's, Saint Joseph the Worker, Resurrection, Saint Columbkille's, and Saint Anthony's.

Since the 1870s the religious character of the area has been shaped by the Catholic Church. In 2010, Catholic adherents who regularly attended services made up about 53% of Dubuque County residents. This contrasts with Iowa as a whole, which was about 17% Catholic in 2010. In addition to churches, 5 religious colleges, 4 area convents, and a nearby abbey and monastery add to the city's religious importance. Dubuque is also the headquarters of the Roman Catholic Archdiocese of Dubuque, which directly administers 1/4 of Iowa's territory for the church, and is the head of the Ecclesiastical Province of Dubuque, the entire state of Iowa.

The city proper is home to 52 different churches (11 Catholic, 40 Protestant, 1 Orthodox), 1 Jewish synagogue, and 1 mosque. Most of non-Catholic population in the city belongs to various Protestant denominations. Dubuque is home to three theological seminaries: St. Pius X Seminary, a minor (college) seminary for Catholic men discerning a call to ordained priesthood, the University of Dubuque Theological Seminary, with the Presbyterian Church USA, and the Wartburg Theological Seminary, with the Evangelical Lutheran Church in America. The latter two institutions train both lay and ordained ministers for placements in churches nationwide.

Economy
For many years, Dubuque's economy was centered on manufacturing companies such as Deere and Company and Flexsteel Industries. While industry still plays a major role in the city, the economy has diversified a great deal in the last decade. Health care, education, tourism, publishing, and financial services are all important sectors of the city's economy. Several major companies are either headquartered in Dubuque or have a significant presence in the city.

Dubuque's largest employers include:

Deere and Company (2,600)
Dubuque Community School District (1,957)
MercyOne Dubuque Medical Center (1,410)
Medical Associates (1,061)
Finley Hospital (975)
Andersen Windows & Doors (900 est.)
City of Dubuque (737)
Sedgwick Claims Management Services (725)

Cottingham & Butler (715)
Heartland Financial USA, Inc (600)
Medline Industries (500)
Holy Family Catholic Schools (475)
Prudential Financial (455)
Diamond Jo Casino (450)
University of Dubuque (450)
A.Y. McDonald Mfg. (425)
Dubuque County (422)
Dupaco Community Credit Union (417)
Nordstrom (412)
Loras College (403)
Hormel (400)
Flexsteel  (280)

Other companies with a large presence in the area include McGraw Hill Education, Duluth Trading Company, Alliant Energy, Woodward Communications, Swiss Valley Farms, the Metrix Company, Rite-Hite Company, and Tschiggfrie Excavating Co.

The mid-2000s saw some diversification from Dubuque's traditional manufacturing based economy. In 2005, the city had the 22nd-highest job growth rate in the nation, far outpacing the rest of Iowa. This was a level of growth similar to those of Austin, Texas, and Orlando, Florida, among others. The city created over 10% of the new jobs in Iowa in 2005, and the number of jobs in Dubuque County reached new all-time highs, with over 57,000 people working in nonfarming jobs.

Government
The City of Dubuque operates on the council-manager form of government, employing a full-time city manager and part-time city council. The city manager, Michael C. Van Milligen, runs the day-to-day operations of the city, and serves as the city's executive leader.

Dubuque has been using its city-owned Community Broadband Network to become a smart city. In 2014, city government officials created four apps to monitor data related to water use, electricity use, transit patterns, and waste recycling efforts. The City of Dubuque Sustainability Coordinator, Cori Burbach, stated this was "for educating citizens and implementing behavior changes that they control based on the data these applications provide". However, Dubuque has been reaching the limits of its network and lack sufficient services from giant providers.

Policy and financial decisions are made by the city council, which serves as the city's legislative body. The council comprises the mayor, Brad Cavanaugh, who serves as its chairman, 4 ward-elected members, and 2 at-large members. The city council members are: Brent M. Shaw (Ward 1), Luis Del Toro (Ward 2), Kate M. Larson (Ward 3), Jake A. Rios (Ward 4), Ric W. Jones (at-large), and David T. Resnick (at-large). The city council meets at 6 P.M. on the first and third Mondays of every month in the council chamber of the Historic Federal Building. The city is divided into 4 electoral wards and 21 precincts, as stated in Chapter 17 of the Dubuque City Code.

In the 89th Iowa General Assembly, Dubuque is represented by Senators Pam Jochum (D) for Senate District 29 and Carrie Koelker (R) for Senate District 50 in the Iowa Senate, and Representatives Charles Isenhart (D) for House District 100, Shannon Lundgren (R) for House District 57, and Lindsay James (D) for House District 99 in the Iowa House of Representatives.

At the federal level in the 117th Congress, it is within Iowa's 1st congressional district, represented by Ashley Hinson (R) in the U.S. House of Representatives. Dubuque, and all of Iowa are represented by U.S. Senators Chuck Grassley (R) and Joni Ernst (R).

Political climate
For most of its history, the people in Dubuque have been mostly Democratic. This was due to the large numbers of working-class people and Catholics living in the city. At times, Dubuque was called "The State of Dubuque" because the political climate in Dubuque was very different from the rest of Iowa. For the most part, Dubuque has maintained itself as a Democratic stronghold, even in recent years.

Notably, however, at the turn of the twentieth century, the United States Congress was led by two Dubuque Republicans. Representative David B. Henderson ascended to Speaker of the U.S. House of Representatives in 1899, at the same time Senator William B. Allison served as Chairman of the U.S. Senate Republican Conference, an office now known as Senate Majority Leader. Like many other largely rural, blue collar midwestern areas Dubuque has experienced a shift toward the Republican party in the 2010s.

Education

Public education
Dubuque is served by the Dubuque Community School District, which covers roughly the eastern half of Dubuque County and enrolled 10,735 students in 20 school buildings in 2006. The district has 13 elementary schools, three middle schools, three high schools, and one preschool complex. It is among the fastest-growing school districts in Iowa, adding over 1,000 students in the last five years.

Public high schools in Dubuque include Dubuque Senior High School and Hempstead High School.

Private education
The city has a large number of students who attend private schools. All Catholic schools are run by the Roman Catholic Archdiocese of Dubuque. The Archdiocese oversees the Holy Family Catholic Schools, which operates 11 schools in the city, including nine early childhood programs, four elementary schools (one of which is a Spanish immersion program), one middle school, and one high school, Wahlert Catholic High School. , Holy Family Catholic Schools enrolled 1,954 students in grades K-12.

Dubuque also has one Lutheran Church–Missouri Synod affiliated elementary school, the Dubuque Lutheran School.

Higher education
Dubuque is home to several higher education institutions. Loras College and Clarke University are two four-year colleges operated by the Roman Catholic Archdiocese of Dubuque. Protestant colleges in the city include the University of Dubuque, which is associated with the Presbyterian Church (USA), and Emmaus Bible College, connected with the Plymouth Brethren movement.

Three theological seminaries operate in the city: St. Pius X Seminary (Roman Catholic, associated with Loras College), the University of Dubuque Theological Seminary (Presbyterian), and Wartburg Theological Seminary (Lutheran).

Other post-secondary schools in the area include Northeast Iowa Community College, which operates its largest campus in nearby Peosta, Iowa and has a satellite campus in Dubuque; the Roman Catholic Divine Word College missions seminary in nearby Epworth, Iowa; and Capri Cosmetology College in Dubuque.

The University of Wisconsin-Platteville is another major university about 20 miles northeast of Dubuque in Platteville, Wisconsin.

Infrastructure

Health and medicine
Dubuque is the regional health care center of the Tri-State area. On March 15, 2012, the Commonwealth Fund released its first Scorecard on Local Health System Performance; it ranked Dubuque second in the nation. The city is home to two major hospitals that, together, have 421 beds. Mercy Medical Center - Dubuque is the largest hospital in the city with 263 beds, and one of only three in Iowa to achieve "Magnet Hospital" status. Magnet Hospitals must meet and maintain strict standards, deeming them some of the best medical facilities in the country. Mercy specializes in various cardiac-related treatments, among other things, and is affiliated with Trinity Health, one of the largest Catholic health delivery system in the United States.

Dubuque's other hospital is The Finley Hospital, which is a member of UnityPoint Health's network of hospitals. Finley is JCAHO accredited, and  had 158 beds. Finley includes the Wendt Regional Cancer Center.

Among other health care facilities, the city is home to two major outpatient clinics. Medical Associates Clinic is the oldest multi-specialty group practice clinic in Iowa, and currently operates two major outpatient clinics in Dubuque, its "East" and "West" campuses. It is affiliated with Mercy Medical Center — Dubuque, and also operates its own HMO, Medical Associates Health Plans.

Transportation

Highways
Dubuque is served by four U.S. Highways (20, 151, 61 and 52) and one state highway (3). Highway 20 is the city's busiest east–west thoroughfare, connecting to Rockford (and I-39/I-90) and Chicago to the east, over the Julien Dubuque Bridge. In the west, it connects to Waterloo. Highways 151 and 61 run north–south through the city, with a shared expressway for part of the route. Highways 52 and 61 both connect Dubuque with the Twin Cities (Minnesota) to the north, with 61 connecting to Davenport (and I-74/I-80), and 52 connecting to Bellevue to the south and then Clinton via U.S. Route 67. Highway 151 connects Dubuque with Madison, Wisconsin (and I-39/I-90/I-94) (via the Dubuque–Wisconsin Bridge) to the northeast and Cedar Rapids to the southwest. Dubuque has four-lane, divided highway connections with Cedar Rapids, Davenport, Madison, and Waterloo.

Iowa State Highway 3 begins in Dubuque, connecting the city with central and western Iowa. The four-lane divided Northwest Arterial (former Iowa State Highway 32) acts as a beltway for parts of the North End and West Side, connecting Highways 3 and 20.

Airport

Dubuque and its region are served by the general-aviation Dubuque Regional Airport . The airport currently has one carrier, Avelo Airlines which operates twice weekly flights to Orlando, Florida, this flight is however suspended currently due to issues with TSA certification at the airport. Several other airlines, mostly regional carriers, have historically served DBQ including Northwest Airlink, American Eagle and several smaller regional carriers. DBQ also serves general aviation and cargo traffic for the Dubuque area.  

Due to limited commercial airline service in the area most travelers originating in Dubuque opt to fly from larger regional airports such Chicago O'Hare, Eastern Iowa Airport in Cedar Rapids and Dane County Regional Airport in Madison.

Mass transit

In Dubuque, public transportation is provided by the city transit division The Jule. The Jule operates multiple bus routes and on-demand paratransit Minibus service throughout the city. The routes are based out of one or more of the three transfer locations and run in 30-minute loops. These loops serve neighborhoods, shopping areas, medical offices, and industrial parks and provide connections to other areas of the city with the 15-minute cross-town Express route. The system's three major transfer stations are Downtown Intermodal (9th & Elm St), Midtown (North Grandview & University Avenues), and the West End (Kennedy Circle/John F. Kennedy Road).

Intercity bus

The Dubuque Intermodal Transportation Center serves as the primary intercity bus hub in Dubuque. Burlington Trailways and Lamers Bus Lines both serve the city.

Intercity rail

Dubuque was served by passenger rail until 1981. As of 2022, only the freight railroads Canadian National and Canadian Pacific serve the city.

Culture
Dubuque has several buildings on the National Register of Historic Places:
The Dubuque Arboretum and Botanical Gardens have won a number of awards.
The Dubuque County Courthouse, with its Beaux-Arts architecture, is on the register.
The Five Flags Theater was built in 1910, and is on the National Historic Landmark Registry. 
The Fourth Street Elevator (also known as the Fenelon Place Elevator) is in downtown Dubuque. The shortest and steepest railroad in existence, it takes passengers up and down one of the large bluffs that dominate the city.
The Grand Opera House was designed by Willoughby J. Edbrooke and erected in 1890. It is Edbrooke's only surviving opera house and designed in the Richardsonian Romanesque style. It was listed on the National Register of Historic Places in 2002.
The Julien Dubuque Bridge is a National Historic Landmark.
Linwood Cemetery is noted for a number of famous people buried there.
The Shot Tower, which was used to produce lead shot and is one of the few such towers left, is also a national historic landmark.

Dubuque has a number of notable parks, particularly Eagle Point Park and the Mines of Spain State Recreation Area.

Dubuque's waterfront features the Ice Harbor and, just north of it, the Diamond Jo Casino and Grand River Event Center.

Dubuque is also the home of the Colts Drum and Bugle Corps. The Colts are a Drum Corps International World Class ensemble and tour the country each summer to attend competitions. Each summer, the Colts and Dubuque host "Music on the March", a Drum Corps International-sanctioned marching competition at Dubuque Senior High School.

The arts organization Voices Productions spearheaded a project to incorporate large murals by street artists Gaia (artist), Werc and Gera and others in downtown Dubuque. So far over 30 murals have been painted. The original concept for the project was developed by Sam Mulgrew, Gene Tully and Wendy Rolfe.

Sports
The city is home to the Dubuque Fighting Saints. They began playing in the Tier I Junior A United States Hockey League in the fall of 2010 at the new Mystique Ice Center. Dubuque was home to the original Fighting Saints team from 1980 to 2001, when the team relocated to Tulsa, Oklahoma. From 2001 to 2010, the Dubuque Thunderbirds replaced the Fighting Saints playing in the Tier III Junior A Central States Hockey League at the Five Flags Center. The 2010-11 Fighting Saints were USHL Clark Cup champions after defeating the Green Bay Gamblers three games to one in the best-of-five Clark Cup Final. In 2013, the Fighting Saints again won the Clark Cup, defeating the Fargo Force three games to none in the final. The team averaged over 2,600 fans per game in the 2013-14 regular season, the highest average in team history.

Dubuque is also home to an Open Division soccer team, Union Dubuque F.C. On October 26, 2017, Union Dubuque announced that it would play in the United Premier Soccer League, a Tier 1 league of the United States Adult Soccer Association, beginning in the league's spring 2018 season. The club is also eligible to participate in the Lamar Hunt U.S. Open Cup. Following the 2019 season, Union Dubuque F.C. announced that it would be joining the newly formed Midwest Premier League along with several nearby clubs.

Dubuque is also home to the 2015 ASA D Northern National champions, Kass & Co. Kass & Co. went 6–0 on the weekend of September 5 and 6 and won the championship game pretty easily with a final score of 30–4 in 5 innings. Even after he ran into the fence on a 600-foot home run by the opposing team, later described as "Pure stupidity", Dan Lucey declared "This is a great day for Dubuque, Iowa."

Media

Print
Dubuque's daily newspaper, the Telegraph Herald, had a daily circulation of nearly 31,000 as of January 27, 2007. Other papers and journals operating in the city include Tri-State Business Times (monthly business paper), 365ink Magazine (biweekly alt/cultural magazine), Julien's Journal (monthly lifestyle magazine), the Dubuque Advertiser (advertisement paper), and the "Tri-States Sports Look" (local sports publication).

Radio

AM radio stations
KDTH 1370 "Voice of the Tri-States", news/talk
WDBQ 1490 "News, Talk, & Sports Leader", news/talk/sports

FM radio stations
WJTY 88.1 "Joy 88", Christian
KIAD 88.5, Christian
KNSY 89.7 "IPR News/Studio One", Iowa Public Radio
KUNI 90.9 "KUNI Radio", Iowa Public Radio
KATF 92.9 "Kat-FM", adult contemporary
K240DZ 95.9 "Augustana Public Radio", public radio
KGRR 97.3 "97.3 The Rock", active rock
WGLR 97.7 "97.7 Country", country
WVRE 101.1 "The River", country
K269EK 101.7 "Classical Music and More", Iowa Public Radio
KXGE 102.3 "Eagle 102", classic rock
WJOD 103.3 "New Country 103", country
KLYV 105.3 "Today's Hit Music Y105", Top 40
KIYX 106.1 "Superhits 106", classic hits
WPVL 107.1 "Xtreme 107.1", Top 40
WDBQ-FM 107.5 "Q107.5", classic hits

Television
Dubuque and surrounding areas are in the Cedar Rapids/Waterloo/Dubuque broadcast media market, which is monitored by the A.C. Nielsen Company for audience research data for advertisers. Dubuque formerly had a local TV news station, KFXA/KFXB Fox 28/40. In 2004, that station became an affiliate of CTN dropping all local programming leaving Dubuque without a local television newsroom. Dubuque is covered by local news bureaus of Cedar Rapids/Waterloo based affiliates.

Dubuque in film
Dubuque is home to the Julien Dubuque Film Festival held every April. Several movies have been filmed in and around Dubuque, including:
 F.I.S.T. (1978), loosely based on the Teamsters union and their former President Jimmy Hoffa
 Take This Job and Shove It (1981)
 Various scenes in Field of Dreams (1989); most of the filming, and the actual field from the movie, were in nearby Dyersville.

Awards and recognition
Dubuque has received a number of awards and recognition for its redevelopment this century.

 2001: First recipient of the Vision Iowa Grant, awarded $40 million to revitalize the Port of Dubuque.
 2006: Urban Pioneer Award by the National Trust for Historic Preservation, in recognition of Dubuque's 20-year commitment to the revitalization of the city's center.
 2006: Audrey Nealson Community Development Achievement Award, given by the National Community Development Association
 2006: Money Magazine identified Dubuque as having the shortest commute time, 11.8 minutes, of all U.S cities.
 2007, 2008 and 2010: ranked among the "100 Best Communities for Young People" by the America's Promise Youth Foundation.
 April 2007: ranked 15th in the "Best Small Places For Business and Careers'" by Forbes, climbing 60 spots from 2006.
 June 2007: All:America City Award, one of 10 cities recognized nationally
 June 2008: Named the "Most Livable" Small City by the United States Conference of Mayors.
 2009: ranked the eighth:best small metro area to launch a small business by CNN Money.
 2009: received the United States Department of Commerce's Excellence in Economic Development Award for Excellence in Historic Preservation:led Strategies for its commitment to research-based, market:driven economic development.
 2009: named one of America's Top 100 Places to Live by RelocateAmerica.com.
 2009: received America's Crown Community Award from American City and Country for collaboration that resulted in IBM's decision to locate a new global technology service delivery center in Dubuque.
 In 2010: Forbes selected Dubuque as the best small city to raise a family in the country.
 In 2010: Forbes ranked Dubuque as the top community for job growth, up from 157th in 2009.
 2010: Excellence in Economic Development Award, presented by the International Economic Development Council
 2010: Greater Dubuque Development was recognized by the Mid-American Economic Development Council for its programs in Business Retention and Expansion and Workforce Development.
 2010: Third:most livable community in the world at the International Awards for Livable Communities.
 2010: ranked seventh:best city in the U.S. for the economic growth of cities under 200,000 people, by Business Facilities Magazine.
 2010: ranked the third:best city for job growth by careerbuilder.com.
 2011: named one of the 10-smartest cities on the planet by Fast Company. (Dubuque was the only city from the Western Hemisphere on the list.)
 2011:2010 received the EPA's Drinking Water Safe Revolving Loan Fund Award for Sustainable Public Health Protection.
 2012: Second All:America City Award, one of 10 cities recognized nationally.
 2013: Third All:America City Award, one of 10 cities recognized nationally.
 2014: USA Today named Dubuque the fourth "Best American Riverfront."

Notable people

See also

 First National Bank of Dubuque
 Parks in Dubuque, Iowa

References

External links

Official Dubuque city website
Encyclopedia Dubuque - searchable database with thousands of articles and images
Co Dubuque - resources for the LGBTQ+ community of Dubuque
City Data comprehensive statistical data and more about Dubuque
How a Midwestern town reinvented itself, BBC News, November 23, 2011, video
Pacific Standard Magazine article "Move to Dubuque, Not San Francisco," Jim Russell January 14, 2014
 Dubuque Newspapers in Google News Archive compiled by Carnegie-Stout Public Library in Dubuque
 

 
Cities in Iowa
Iowa populated places on the Mississippi River
County seats in Iowa
Cities in Dubuque County, Iowa
Driftless Area
1833 establishments in Michigan Territory